The Barbed Coil is a fantasy novel by J. V. Jones, published in 1997.

Plot 
The novel is set mostly in the Kingdom of Rhaize where the coming together of three individuals, Tessa McCamfrey, Ravis of Burano and Camron of Thorn, is about to unleash a series of events that culminate in the fight to save the kingdom from the armies of Garizon.

Tessa has suddenly been thrust from her life of telesales in present-day Earth into a world filled with danger where she meets Lord Ravis, who is himself delayed in a city which has been "marked for the kill". Camron of Thorn is a man seeking revenge for his father's murder and demands that Lord Ravis help him to achieve it.

References

External sources
 http://jvj.com/barbedhome.html

1997 novels